Scoparia obsoleta is a moth in the family Crambidae. It was described by Staudinger in 1879. It is found in Turkey.

References

Moths described in 1879
Scorparia